Leslie Amado Pogliacomi (born 3 May 1976 in Sydney) is a retired association football player.

Club career
He was dropped for Chris Day by Ronnie Moore in the 2005–2006 season, and went to Blackpool F.C. However, John Sheridan brought him back to Oldham in the 2006/2007 season. Pogliacomi was an Australian Schoolboy International in 1994 and represented the Australia Under 20 team in 1995. Pogliacomi started playing top flight football in Australia for various NSL teams before being rated one of the better goalkeepers playing in Australia before moving to England. He is well known for being the goalkeeper for Wollongong Wolves in 2000 when they won the NSL grand final against Perth Glory 3–3 (7–6 on penalties) where two saves of his, with the game on the line, won the championship for Wollongong.

On 26 February 2008, it was announced that due to an injury requiring extensive surgery and rehabilitation, Pogliacomi's contract with Oldham Athletic was mutually terminated. He now plays for a small team in Adelaide for fun and works in his father-in-law's business.

References

External links
 Oldham Athletic profile
 Oz Football profile

1976 births
Living people
Soccer players from Sydney
Australian people of Italian descent
Australian expatriate sportspeople in England
Association football goalkeepers
Australian expatriate soccer players
National Soccer League (Australia) players
FFSA Super League players
Adelaide City FC players
Blackpool F.C. players
Campbelltown City SC players
Marconi Stallions FC players
Oldham Athletic A.F.C. players
Parramatta Power players
Wollongong Wolves FC players
National Premier Leagues players
Australian soccer players